Kyarkibash,  is an abandoned village in Gegharkunik Province of Armenia.

See also 
Gegharkunik Province

References 

Former populated places in Gegharkunik Province